The Confederate States of America (1861–1865) only had one president, who was Jefferson Davis. In various American Civil War alternate histories where the Confederacy won the American Civil War and continued its existence, various people have served in the office of the presidency of the Confederacy.

Historical figures

George W. Bush
 In the Family Guy episode Back to the Pilot, Brian Griffin prevented the September 11th attacks from occurring by telling his past self about them ahead of time when he traveled back in time to 1999 with Stewie, originally to find a lost tennis ball. As a result, George W. Bush, without any fear to exploit, lost the 2004 election, possibly to John Kerry. Bush returned to Texas and reformed the Confederacy from nine unspecified Southern states. This triggered a devastating Second American Civil War during which 17 million people were killed in concentrated nuclear strikes along the Eastern seaboard. The original timeline was restored by the end of the episode but not before myriad versions of Brian and Stewie warn their past selves to either allow or prevent 9/11 due to the disastrous consequences of their previous versions' alterations to the timeline.

John F. Kennedy
 In C.S.A.: The Confederate States of America, written and directed by Kevin Willmott, John F. Kennedy was elected president in 1960 over Democratic candidate Richard Nixon (considered unlikely as he was a Northern, Roman Catholic Republican), when only twenty-nine percent of voters approved of slavery. This and Canadian advancements in culture and sport prompted Kennedy to pursue emancipation. However, Kennedy's plans for emancipation and female enfranchisement were sidelined by the Newfoundland Missile Crisis and an expansionist campaign in Southeast Asia and ultimately ended by his assassination. In the film, he is stated as being the first Northerner to hold the Confederate presidency, although this is contradicted by its companion website whose timeline mentions the election of other Northerners prior to Kennedy.

Robert E. Lee
 Robert E. Lee is often depicted as an independent successor to Jefferson Davis as president in American Civil War alternate histories, such as Bring the Jubilee and The Guns of the South.

James Longstreet
 In If the South Had Won the Civil War by MacKinlay Kantor, James Longstreets presidency saw the adoption of the Liberty Bill in 1885 which abolished slavery throughout the entire Confederacy.
 In the Southern Victory Series book How Few Remain by Harry Turtledove, James Longstreet's presidency saw the Confederate purchase of Sonora and Chihuahua from the Mexican Empire, a Confederate victory in the Second Mexican War (1881–1882) and the manumission of the Confederate slave population (albeit as a condition of British and French military aid which almost led to a coup). His (fictional) grandson, Samuel Longstreet, served as C. S. Senator for Virginia and became the first Whig in Confederate history to lose a presidential election, following the victory of Freedom Party candidate Jake Featherston in 1933.

William McKinley
 On the online timeline of the 2004 mockumentary CSA: The Confederate States of America, William McKinley served as the President of the Confederate States of America from the late 1800s until 1901. According to the timeline, he was president during the alternate version of the Spanish–American War, which sparked  a resurgence in the Manifest Destiny and the Confederacy's continued expansion south that would continue well into the 1920s and would include all of the Caribbean, Mexico, Central and South America as part of the nation's conquered territories. In 1901, McKinley was assassinated at the Pan-American Exposition (as in reality). However, instead of being shot by Leon Czolgosz, an anarchist, he was instead killed by an abolitionist.

Richard Nixon
 In the film C.S.A.: The Confederate States of America, a 2004 mockumentary directed by Kevin Willmott which depicts a timeline in which the Confederacy won the American Civil War, completely annexed and absorbed the United States, and perpetuated slavery. By 1960, when only 29 percent of voters approve of slavery, Democratic candidate Richard Nixon was defeated by Roman Catholic Republican candidate John F. Kennedy. On the online timeline of the film, it is reveled that Nixon was eventually elected Confederate President in his own right. During his presidency, Nixon travels to China in 1972 (the first time a Confederate President would do so). His talks with the Chinese government would open the way for Confederate-run labor camps to be run in China, which results in cheaper goods being made and imported from China. However, that year on June 17, five men were caught placing wire taps at the Watergate Hotel in order to spy on the Confederate National Committee. As the investigation wore on, it became clear that the orders came from high-up. How high up was unclear until a mysterious anonymous source, using the code name “Dark Throat”, tipped off the CBI that Nixon gave the orders to place the taps. Under pressure from the press and the CBI investigation of the Watergate scandal Nixon was forced to resign from the presidency on August 8, 1974 (as in real life). During his resignation speech he reminded the public, “I am not a Negro!”. Still, years from the event, the mystery surrounding the informant “Dark Throat” is still speculated about. The most popular theory is that one of the White House slaves had overheard the President, and turn against Nixon by turning him in to the CBI. With the penalty of slaves turning against their masters in the Confederacy being death, it is unlikely the informant would ever even be known.

Ronald Reagan
 In the 2004 mockumentary film CSA: The Confederate States of America, Ronald Reagan served as president of the Confederacy sometime during the 1980s, possibly as a Democrat. At one point in the film, a newspaper called CSA Today (a parody of USA Today) shows a picture of Reagan, reporting his appointment of John Ambrose Fauntroy V as C. S. Commerce Secretary. In addition, a blurb quoting a Canadian prime minister (likely Brian Mulroney) saying "Mr. Reagan, tear down this wall!" (referring to the 'Cotton Curtain' erected along the Confederate-Canadian border) also appears in the same newspaper.

Theodore Roosevelt
 On the online timeline of the 2004 mockumentary CSA: The Confederate States of America, Theodore Roosevelt served in the Spanish–American War in the Battle of San Juan Hill as part of the Rough Riders much like he does in reality. A journal excerpt describes the assault he led up Kettle Hill, "With a pistol in one hand an a saber in the other, he spurred his mount forward. His face grew flushed; his glasses clouded with steam; a wide grin covered his face. He saw the Spanish fleeing before him. He fired at one of them, who fell as neatly as a jackrabbit". The alternate version of the Spanish–American War would spark a resurgence in the Manifest Destiny and the Confederacy's continued expansion south that would continue well into the 1920s and would include all of the Caribbean, Mexico, Central and South America as part of the nation's conquered territories. Theodore Roosevelt would eventually become Confederate President after 1901.

Woodrow Wilson
 In If the South Had Won the Civil War by MacKinlay Kantor, Woodrow Wilson leads the Confederacy into the First World War on the side of the Entente (alongside the United States led by Theodore Roosevelt).
 In the Southern Victory Series books The Great War: American Front and The Great War: Walk in Hell by Harry Turtledove, Woodrow Wilson is depicted as the ninth president of the Confederate States and a member of the aristocratic Whig Party. He became president in 1910 after his victory in the 1909 presidential election and led the Confederacy (as a lame duck) during the First Great War (1914–1917) until March 1916 (when his term expired) on the side of the Entente against the United States, a member of the Central Powers in this timeline. He was succeeded by his vice president, Gabriel Semmes.

Fictional characters

Wade Hampton V
 President in the Southern Victory Series by Harry Turtledove. The fictional descendant of Wade Hampton III, Hampton is elected president in 1921 over Jake Featherston (Freedom Party) and Ainsworth Layne (Radical Liberal), but is assassinated by Freedom Party stalwart Grady Calkins in Birmingham, Alabama in June 1922. Hampton's assassination, the first of a president in either US or CS history in this alternate timeline, allows for the cancellation of hyperinflation-inducing war reparations paid by the Confederacy to the United States following the First Great War.

President Lee
 The Southern Victory Series by Harry Turtledove mentions a "President Lee," though Robert E. Lee is often referred to in the series only as a general; it is never specified whether the president is intended to be him, his son Rooney Lee or his nephew Fitzhugh Lee.

Burton Mitchel
 President in the Southern Victory Series by Harry Turtledove. Possibly the fictional descendant of Charles B. Mitchel, Mitchel became president in 1922 after the assassination of Wade Hampton V by Grady Calkins, a stalwart of the Freedom Party. He successfully ran for election in his own right in 1927 (erroneously reported as running for re-election) after the Confederate Supreme Court ruled that he was eligible despite serving for most of his predecessor's six-year term, most likely to prevent Jake Featherston from being elected. After the start of the Great Depression in 1929, Mitchel is blamed for the Confederacy's economic woes, with shanty towns across the country being dubbed "Mitcheltowns" (the equivalent of the U.S.'s "Blackfordburghs" and the "Hoovervilles" in real-life). Mitchel would be the last Whig Party president of the Confederacy after Featherston's victory in the 1933 presidential election, defeating the Whig candidate Samuel Longstreet (the fictional grandson of James Longstreet).

Donald Partridge
 President in the Southern Victory Series by Harry Turtledove. A caricature of Dan Quayle, he became vice president after an unsuccessful coup led by his predecessor Willy Knight following the repeal of presidential term limits, having previously served as a C.S. Senator from Tennessee. Considered Knight's polar opposite, Partridge is a useless, harmless idiot who spent most of his time telling Featherston dumb farm-girl jokes and spending time in the company of various women, which in no small part deterred any plans to overthrow Featherston especially during the Second Great War (1941–1944). He eventually became Confederate president after Jake Featherston was assassinated by Cassius Madison, overseeing the Confederacy's surrender to the United States after the war, unwittingly agreeing to the dissolution of the Confederacy (including the office of the Confederate President) and the subsequent annexation of its former territories by the US. Having served as president for one week from 7 July 1944 to 14 July 1944, Partridge's reputation and limited role in the Featherston administration may have spared him from the fates that befell more active members such as Attorney General Ferdinand Koenig or Communications Director Saul Goldwyn, who were both executed for crimes against humanity since they had helped Featherston in his "Population reduction" of Black people in the Confederacy.

Gabriel Semmes
 President in the Southern Victory Series by Harry Turtledove. The possible descendant of Confederate Naval captain Raphael Semmes, Semmes succeeds Woodrow Wilson as president in 1916, having defeated Radical Liberal opponent Doroteo Arango in the 1915 presidential election. Semmes oversees the Confederate effort in the First Great War from 1916 until its eventual defeat by the United States in 1917, leaving office in disgrace in 1922 when his term expired.

See also
 American Civil War alternate histories
 Lists of fictional presidents of the United States

References

Lists of fiction lists
Confederate States
Fictional people of the Confederate States of America
American Civil War alternate histories